Alessandro Bastoni  (born 13 April 1999) is an Italian professional footballer who plays as a centre-back for  club Inter and the Italy national team.

Early career
Bastoni was born in Casalmaggiore, Lombardy, and began his career in the local Rivarolo Mantovano youth side, where his father was coach. At the age of 7, he joined the youth side of Serie A club Atalanta.

Club career

Atalanta
Bastoni progressed through various age groups at Bergamo, including making nearly 30 appearances for the under-17 side, before eventually progressing to the Primavera side, where he established himself as a regular starter at the centre of defence. He was named on the first-team bench for the first time on 30 October 2016, for the game against Genoa, and made his full debut a month later in the Coppa Italia game against Pescara, playing the full game in a 3–0 victory. In Serie A, Bastoni remained as an unused substitute for the six games after Genoa until making his debut in a 1–0 win over Sampdoria on 22 January 2017, playing full 90 minutes.

Inter Milan
On 31 August 2017, Inter Milan announced the signing of Bastoni for €31 million, and on the same day, his loan at Atalanta for the next two seasons. Inter officially recalled defender Alessandro Bastoni early from his loan with Atalanta and renewed his contract until 2023 on 14 July 2018.

Loan to Parma
On 7 August 2018, Bastoni joined Parma on loan until 30 June 2019. He made his debut on 7 October 2018, in the league match won 3–1 away against Genoa.

International career
Bastoni has been capped by Italy at every level from U15 to U19. His first international goal came in a 4–0 win over Norway whilst playing for the under-16 team. He was first called up to the under-18 side by coach Paolo Nicolato in August 2016, and was made captain in his second game; a 2–2 draw with the Netherlands. He was called up to the Italy under-19 side by coach Paolo Nicolato on 9 August 2017 at the age of 18.

He made his debut with the Italy U21 team on 11 October 2018, in a friendly match lost 1–0 against Belgium. He became immediately a starter and he took part in the 2019 UEFA European Under-21 Championship on home soil.

Bastoni received his first call up to the senior Italy squad from manager Roberto Mancini, for the UEFA Nations League matches against Bosnia Herzegovina and Netherlands in September 2020. He made his senior debut for Italy on 11 November, starting in a 4–0 friendly win against Estonia in Florence.

In June 2021, Bastoni was included in Italy's squad for UEFA Euro 2020. He made his first and only appearance of the tournament in Italy's final group match, starting in a 1–0 victory against Wales in Rome on 20 June; the result allowed them to top their group. On 11 July, Bastoni won the European Championship with Italy following a 3–2 penalty shoot-out victory over England at Wembley Stadium in the final, after a 1–1 draw in extra-time.

On 14 June 2022, in Italy's fourth group match of the UEFA Nations League, Bastoni scored his first international goal in a 5–2 away loss to Germany.

Style of play
A left–footed defender, Bastoni started his career as a full-back, but is also capable of playing as a centre-back, a role in which he became increasingly deployed as his career progressed. He is mainly known for his passing ability and ball control, while his height and ability to exploit spaces allows him to be effective in the air, which makes him a goal threat from indirect set–pieces. Regarded as a promising young player in the media, in 2020, he was included in the list of "Fifty for the future: UEFA.com's ones to watch."

Personal life
Bastoni's father, Nicola, was also a footballer, who played as a left–back for Cremonese. On 6 October 2020, it was announced that Bastoni tested positive for COVID-19, while being asymptomatic, amid its pandemic in Italy. On January 21, 2022, his long-time partner gave birth to a daughter, who was named Azzurra.

Career statistics

Club

International

Italy score listed first, score column indicates score after each Bastoni goal.

Honours
Inter Milan
Serie A: 2020–21
 Coppa Italia: 2021–22
 Supercoppa Italiana: 2021, 2022
UEFA Europa League runner-up: 2019–20

Italy
UEFA European Championship: 2020
UEFA Nations League third place: 2020–21

Individual
Serie A Team of the Year: 2020–21

Orders
 5th Class / Knight: Cavaliere Ordine al Merito della Repubblica Italiana: 2021

References

External links

 Profile at the Inter Milan website
 
 Alessandro Bastoni at TBPlayers

1999 births
Living people
People from Casalmaggiore
Footballers from Lombardy
Italian footballers
Association football central defenders
Italy youth international footballers
Italy under-21 international footballers
Italy international footballers
UEFA European Championship-winning players
UEFA Euro 2020 players
Atalanta B.C. players
Inter Milan players
Parma Calcio 1913 players
Serie A players
Knights of the Order of Merit of the Italian Republic
Sportspeople from the Province of Cremona